T30 may refer to:

Aviation 
 McKinley Field, in Frio County, Texas, United States
 Slingsby T.30 Prefect, a British glider
 Terzi T30 Katana, an Italian aerobatic monoplane

Other uses 

 T.30 (ITU-T recommendation), a fax protocol
 Cooper T30, a British racing car
 
 IBM ThinkPad T30, a laptop computer
 Tanabe Station, in Higashisumiyoshi-ku, Osaka, Japan
 T-30 Citycruiser, a Canadian bus
 T30 Heavy Tank, an American tank project
 T30 Howitzer Motor Carriage, an American self-propelled gun